Javed–Mohsin is an Indian Bollywood Hindi film music composer duo consisting of Javed Khan and Mohsin Shaikh known for movies like Munna Michael, Julie 2, Jalebi and Drive. Javed- Mohsin are the first cousins related from their maternal side. Javed Khan’s father was a tabla player Late Ustad Sharafat Ali Khan and  Mohsin Shaikh’s father is a writer Mustafa Shaikh. Javed–Mohsin’s maternal grandfather was Late Ustad Fayyaz Ahmed Khan from Kirana Gharana (house of Indian classical music).

Career
Javed- Mohsin started their journey into music by scoring music for ads, jingle and radio spot music in 2012. In 2015, Javed–Mohsin did their debut as a Bollywood Film Music composer, by composing original song "Dj Bajega Toh Pappu Nachega" for director duo Abbas-Mustan for their film Kis Kisko Pyaar Karoon starring Kapil Sharma, Elli AvrRam, Arbaaz Khan. Other than this the duo has composed songs for Munna Michael, Julie 2, Jalebi and Drive. Besides the  film, the duo has composed songs for album Dil Mera Blast sung by  Darshan Raval under Indie Music level. They have also composed for T-series albums Meri maa and Saara India with singer Jubin Nautiyal and Danish Sabri respectively.

Filmography

Non-film albums 
Javed–Mohsin have scored music for some albums as music directors.

References

External links
 Javed Mohsin on Gaana
 Javed Mohsin on Filmibeat 
 Javed Mohsin on Box Office India
 Javed Mohsin on Bollywood Hungama

Indian Muslims
Indian film score composers
Indian musical duos
Indian male film score composers